Voll is a former municipality in Møre og Romsdal county, Norway.  It existed from 1874 until its dissolution in 1964. The  municipality encompassed the Måndalen and Innfjorden valleys west of the Romsdalsfjorden in the west-central part of the present-day Rauma Municipality.  The administrative centre of the village was the village of Måndalen which is also where the main Voll Church is located.

History
The municipality of Voll was established on 1 January 1874 when the old municipality of Eid og Voll was divided into the municipalities of Eid (population: 1,048) and Voll (population: 695). During the 1960s, there were many municipal mergers across Norway due to the work of the Schei Committee. On 1 January 1964, the municipality of Voll (population: 1,163) was merged with the neighboring municipalities of Eid (population: 381), Grytten (population: 3,683), Hen (population: 1,663), and the southern part of Veøy municipality (population: 1,400) to form the new Rauma Municipality.

Government
All municipalities in Norway, including Voll, are responsible for primary education (through 10th grade), outpatient health services, senior citizen services, unemployment and other social services, zoning, economic development, and municipal roads.  The municipality is governed by a municipal council of elected representatives, which in turn elects a mayor.

Municipal council
The municipal council  of Voll was made up of 17 representatives that were elected to four year terms.  The party breakdown of the final municipal council was as follows:

See also
List of former municipalities of Norway

References

Rauma, Norway
Former municipalities of Norway
1874 establishments in Norway
1964 disestablishments in Norway